Mathías Nicolás Abero Villan (born 9 April 1990) is a Uruguayan footballer who plays for Uruguayan Segunda División club Cerro, as a left-back.

Club career

Nacional
Born in Montevideo, Abero began his career as a youth player for Nacional. He made his first-team debut on 13 June 2009 in a 0–3 league loss to Central Español. This was his only appearance in 2008–09 season. Nacional eventually won the league.

In July he made three league appearances for Nacional and in January he was loaned to Racing Montevideo. He made his debut for Racing on 20 February in a 0–3 league loss to Cerrito. He ended the 2009–10 with six league appearances for Racing. In the next season Abero made 25 appearances and scored one goal (on 7 May 20111 in a 6–0 win over Danubio.

In June 2011 Abero returned to Nacional. On 9 October in a 3–0 win over Rentistas he scored his first goal for Nacional. Abero ended the 2011–12 with 17 appearances and three goals. He also won his second league title with Nacional.

Bologna
On 19 July 2012 he signed with a Serie A side Bologna.

International career
Abero was part of the Uruguay U-17 squad that participated in the 2007 South American Under-17 Football Championship

In 2011, he was called by Juan Verzeri to participate in the Uruguay U-22 squad for the 2011 Pan American Games. In this tournament he scored twice, one goal against Trinidad and Tobago and one against the Mexican selection.

On 25 April 2012, he played an international match for Uruguay U-23 against Egypt U-23 in Paysandú.

Abero is also eligible to play for Italy because he has an Italian passport and because of his Italian ancestry.

Honours

Club
Nacional
 Uruguayan Primera División (2): 2008–09, 2011–12

References

External links

1990 births
Living people
Footballers from Montevideo
Association football defenders
Uruguayan footballers
Uruguayan expatriate footballers
Uruguay youth international footballers
Footballers at the 2011 Pan American Games
Pan American Games medalists in football
Pan American Games bronze medalists for Uruguay
Medalists at the 2011 Pan American Games
Club Nacional de Football players
Racing Club de Montevideo players
Bologna F.C. 1909 players
U.S. Avellino 1912 players
Atlético de Rafaela footballers
Club Atlético Tigre footballers
Atlético Tucumán footballers
Club Atlético Patronato footballers
C.A. Rentistas players
Montevideo Wanderers F.C. players
C.A. Cerro players
Uruguayan Primera División players
Argentine Primera División players
Serie A players
Serie B players
Expatriate footballers in Italy
Expatriate footballers in Argentina
Uruguayan expatriate sportspeople in Italy
Uruguayan expatriate sportspeople in Argentina